Trinchesia sororum is a species of sea slug, an aeolid nudibranch, a marine gastropod mollusc in the family Trinchesiidae.

Distribution
This species was described from Australia.

References

External links
  Burn, R. F. (2006). A checklist and bibliography of the Opisthobranchia (Mollusca: Gastropoda) of Victoria and the Bass Strait area, south-eastern Australia. Museum Victoria Science Reports. 10:1–42

Trinchesiidae
Gastropods described in 1964